Colorblind James Experience were an American alternative roots/pop/rock band founded in 1980 in Rochester, New York, United States.  Bandleader and singer/songwriter/guitarist "Colorblind" James Charles Cuminale was originally from Rochester, New York, but assembled early versions of what would become the Experience in Oswego, New York, before relocating to San Francisco, California.  After a couple years of mixed results there, the band regrouped and moved again, this time back to Rochester which remained its home base until Cuminale's premature death in 2001.  The band enjoyed brief fame in the UK and Europe after BBC DJ John Peel gave the Experience some exposure. Their "Dance Critters" single reached number 10 on the UK Indie Chart, while their albums Colorblind James Experience and Why Should I Stand Up reached numbers 5 and 13 respectively.

Often humorous ("The music stopped.  And then it started again.") and parodic, and just as often laced with a profoundly questioning spirituality; their music blended elements of polka, country, cocktail jazz, blues, rockabilly, Tex-Mex, rock and roll and other genres.  The band's sound was to a large extent inspired by the "old, weird America" chased by Bob Dylan and The Band during their Basement Tapes period, but other prominent influences included Ray Charles, Randy Newman, and Van Morrison.

Their line-up changed repeatedly over the years, and their third album was released under the name of Colorblind James and the Death Valley Boys.

History

1978-1981: Formation
The Colorblind James Experience began as Colorblind James & The White Caps.  While primarily based around the original songs of Chuck Cuminale, a.k.a. Colorblind James, the band also featured original songs by lead guitarist G. Elwyn Meixner.  Rounding out the line-up were Rush Tattered, née Russell Tarby, on lead vocals, Kevin McDevitt on drums and Terry O’Neill on bass.

The band was formed in Oswego, New York, and christened the White Caps in homage to both Gene Vincent and the Blue Caps as well as the ubiquitous white caps of Lake Ontario.  It was an immediate hit drawing a large and loyal following to the Market House Music Hall located on Oswego's Water Street.  The songs were mostly executed in a fast and frantic two-beat style propelled by Kevin McDevitt’s manic and ferocious drumming.

1980-1984: From Oswego to San Francisco, San Francisco to Rochester
In the summer of 1980, after enjoying two years of success in their hometown, Cuminale looked west to San Francisco as the ‘next step’ for the band.  Inviting the entire band to join him, he was surprised to find only McDevitt was eager to make the trip.  He recruited Phil Marshall to take over on guitar and Gene Tighe to play bass.  In the fall of 1980, the four members caravaned west with Marshall and McDevitt arriving the day after Thanksgiving.

During the band’s time in San Francisco, Tighe was replaced by Oswego native Thad Iorizzo who was, in turn, replaced by Dan O'Donnell and then Dave Fisher.  The band released one 45rpm record, "Talk To Me" b/w "Kojak Chair" to little critical or commercial success.  In the summer of 1984, the band dissolved and Cuminale and his wife moved back east to Rochester, New York.   Guitarist Phil Marshall rejoined the band a few months later.

In Rochester, the band included former White Caps guitarist G. Elwyn, bassist Bernie Heveron (an alumnus of Personal Effects) and Jim McAvaney on drums.  The band scraped together enough money to press 1000 copies of its debut self-titled LP in 1987.  Cuminale sent one copy abroad and specifically to BBC Radio's John Peel. The song "Considering a Move to Memphis" made Peel's year end Festive Fifty list.

1987: Record contract (Fundamental/Red Rhino)
The band was signed to Fundamental Records in the US and its sister company, Red Rhino, in the UK.  Prior to touring, G. Elwyn left the band, followed shortly by Bernie Heveron.  Auditions were held and the remaining trio were joined by David McIntire on clarinet/sax, John Ebert on trombone and Ken Frank on bass.

1988-1990: Fame in the UK: the touring years
On October 17, 1988 the band landed at Heathrow Airport ready to embark on what would be the first of three European tours.

The band followed up its debut LP with Why Should I Stand Up?, which was released on Cooking Vinyl in the UK and Capitol subsidiary Gold Castle in the States.  The all-acoustic album Strange Sounds From the Basement was released only in the UK and found the band working under the name Colorblind James and the Death Valley Boys, though they were subsequently dropped by Cooking Vinyl and Gold Castle.

1991-1993: American success eludes the band
The release of Solid! Behind The Times on the US folk label Red House found the band without a UK label for the first time.  While Red House pinned their hopes on the CD's success, the band was not in a position to tour the States extensively since the time between 1991 and 1993 found many long-time members leaving the band.

1993-2001: The post-touring years
The release of I Could Be Your Guide found Cuminale and McAvaney joined by Gary Holt on bass, Tommy Tramontana on guitar, “Brother” Charles Jaffe on keyboards, Rita Coulter on vocals, and Ethan Lyons on saxophone. That CD was followed by the final studio CD, titled Call Of The Wild (1999).

Chuck Cuminale died of arrhythmia in July 2001.

On July 8, 2008, a tribute to Chuck and his music was performed by an ensemble composed of musicians who had played with various incarnations of the band, as well as Chuck’s son Mark on guitar. The performance was recorded for WXXI's OnStage.

Rush Tattered: vocals (1978–1980)
Phil Marshall: vocals/guitar (1980–1993)
Jimmy McAvaney: drums (1985–2001)
Bernie Heveron: upright bass (1985–1987)
Rita Coulter: vocals (1991–2001)
Brother Jaffe: keyboards (1993–2001)
Mark Cuminale: guitar.

Discography

Singles
 "Blind Girl" b/w "America America" (as Colorblind James & The White Caps) (1980) 7" 45rpm
 "Talk To Me" b/w "Kojak Chair" (1983) 7" 45rpm
 "Sophisticated" b/w "Havoc Theme" (1988) 7" 45rpm
 "Dance Critters" (1988) 12" 45rpm re-mix
 "That's Entertainment" b/w "Buster Cornelius" (1989) 7" 45rpm

Albums
 Colorblind James Experience (1987)
 Why Should I Stand Up? (1989)
 The Peel Sessions EP (1989)
 Strange Sounds from the Basement (1990) (as Colorblind James and the Death Valley Boys)
 The Rochester Sessions (1992)
 Solid! Behind the Times (1992)
 I Could Be Your Guide (1996)
 Call of the Wild (1999)
 Greatest Hits! (2000)

References

External links
Tribute page to Cuminale at Rochester e-zine The Refrigerator
CbJE info and images of album covers

Musical groups from San Francisco
Musical groups from New York (state)